Paulo Henrique Santos de Azevedo (born 30 March 1991) is a Brazilian professional footballer who plays as a forward for UAE First Division League club Al Rams.

Club career

Malta
On 31 January 2020, it was announced that Santa Lucia had signed Henrique on a one-year contract. He played for this club only 5 months by making 4 appearances and scored 1 goal, then on 11 July 2020, he signed a contract with Maltese Challenge League club Marsa, with his club, he made 15 appearances and scored 3 goals. On 1 February 2021, Henrique joined GFL First Division club Victoria Hotspurs on loan from Marsa.

Indonesia
On 15 June 2021, he made his first career by arriving in Indonesia after a one year career in Malta, then on 1 July he signed a one year contract with Indonesian Liga 1 club Persiraja Banda Aceh. He made his professional debut for the club, in a 2–1 loss against Bhayangkara on 29 August 2021. He also scored his first goal for Persiraja, where he scored with a header in the 32nd minutes.

References

External links
 Brazil – Paulo Henrique Santos de Azevedo – Profile with news, career statistics and history at Soccerway

1991 births
Living people
Brazilian footballers
Footballers from Rio de Janeiro (city)
Association football forwards
Brazilian expatriate footballers
Campeonato Brasileiro Série D players
Maltese Premier League players
Maltese Challenge League players
Gozo Football League First Division players
Liga 1 (Indonesia) players
Clube Recreativo e Atlético Catalano players
Mixto Esporte Clube players
CE Operário Várzea-Grandense players
Boavista Sport Club players
Iporá Esporte Clube players
União Agrícola Barbarense Futebol Clube players
Santos Futebol Clube (AP) players
Esporte Clube Internacional players
Sport Club São Paulo players
Arapongas Esporte Clube players
Guarany Futebol Clube players
St. Lucia F.C. players
Marsa F.C. players
Victoria Hotspurs F.C. players
Persiraja Banda Aceh players
Brazilian expatriate sportspeople in Malta
Expatriate footballers in Malta
Brazilian expatriate sportspeople in Indonesia
Expatriate footballers in Indonesia